The second season of the Seven Network television series A Place to Call Home premiered on 11 May 2014 and concluded on 13 July 2014.

Production 
On 15 July 2013, Channel Seven released an announcement which confirmed that A Place to Call Home had been commissioned for a second season, set to air in May 2014. Brad Lyons, the Director of Network Production at Seven stated, "A Place to Call Home has showcased drama on a scale never seen before on Australian television. It's pleasing to see such an ambitious production receive the acclaim it deserves."

Pre-production for season 2 began in August 2013. Filming for the second season began in September 2013 and wrapped in December 2013.

In June 2014, Glen Williams from TV Week reported that Channel Seven had passed on the option to renew the series and had recently told the cast and crew they would not be required for a third season. Due to this, the last episode of season two had to be hastily rewritten and filmed to accommodate the cancellation and tie up any loose storylines. However, on 25 October 2014, it was announced the show was to be revived by Foxtel for at least two more seasons. Due to the revival, the original ending was aired later to give the original lead-in to season three.

Cast

Main 
 Marta Dusseldorp as Sarah Adams
 Noni Hazelhurst as Elizabeth Bligh
 Brett Climo as George Bligh
 Craig Hall as Dr. Jack Duncan
 David Berry as James Bligh
 Abby Earl as Anna Bligh
 Arianwen Parkes-Lockwood as Olivia Bligh
 Aldo Mignone as Angelo "Gino" Poletti
 Sara Wiseman as Carolyn Bligh
 Matt Levett as Andrew Swanson
 Frankie J. Holden as Roy Briggs

Recurring 
 Deborah Kennedy as Doris Collins
 Jenni Baird as Regina Standish
 Heather Mitchell as Prudence Swanson
 Amy Mathews as Amy Polson
 Jacinta Acevski as Alma Grey
 Dina Panozzo as Carla Poletti
 Ella Clark as Amo Poletti
 Ben Winspear as Dr. Rene Nordmann

Guest 
 Siena Elchaar as Gilda Poletti
 Scott Grimley as Norman Parker
 Andrew McFarlane
 Jeff Truman as Father Joe
 Jason Montgomery as Adam Farrell
 Erica Lovell as Eve Walker
 Tristan Maxwell as Colin Walker
 Indi & Izzi Scott as Louise Walker
 Martin Sacks as Itzaak Gold
 Lisa Peers as Miriam Gold
 Michael Sheasby as Bert Ford
 Arianwen Parkes-Lockwood as Samantha
 Judi Farr as Peg Maloney
 Adam Gray-Hayward as Dr. Rene Nordmann

Casting 
Amy Polson was originally played by Krew Boylan, however due to scheduling issues, the role is now played by Amy Mathews. Sara Wiseman and Matt Levett, who portray Carolyn Bligh and Andrew Swanson respectively, have both been promoted to the main cast. Jenni Baird and Deborah Kennedy, who portray Regina Standish and Doris Collins respectively, will both return for season two.

Episodes

Notes 
  "Answer Me, My Love" aired in Melbourne and Adelaide on 22 June 2014, and in Sydney, Brisbane and Perth on 29 June 2014.

Home media

Notes

References

External links 

 
 

2014 Australian television seasons